Charlestown Township is one of the eighteen townships of Portage County, Ohio, United States.  The 2020 census found 1,735 people in the township.

Geography
Located in the center of the county, it borders the following townships:
Freedom Township - north
Windham Township - northeast corner
Paris Township - east
Palmyra Township - southeast corner
Edinburg Township - south
Rootstown Township - southwest corner
Ravenna Township - west
Shalersville Township - northwest corner

No municipalities are located in Charlestown Township.

Much of the township, however, is occupied by state and federal installations. Camp Ravenna Joint Military Training Center, created in 1941, covers most of the northern half of the township, while West Branch State Park and the Michael J. Kirwan reservoir, opened in 1966, occupies much of the southern half.

Name and history
Charlestown Township was organized in 1814 and is the only Charlestown Township statewide. A post office called Charlestown was established in 1820, and remained in operation until 1904.

Government
The township is governed by a three-member board of trustees, who are elected in November of odd-numbered years to a four-year term beginning on the following January 1. Two are elected in the year after the presidential election and one is elected in the year before it. There is also an elected township fiscal officer, who serves a four-year term beginning on April 1 of the year after the election, which is held in November of the year before the presidential election. Vacancies in the fiscal officership or on the board of trustees are filled by the remaining trustees.

References

External links
County website

Townships in Portage County, Ohio
Townships in Ohio